Sgt. Shonen's Exploding Plastic Eastman Band Request Mono! Stereo (also known as Mono! Stereo or simply Mono!) is a 1989 album by Tater Totz. Tater Totz is a supergroup made up of members of Red Kross, Shonen Knife and The Runaways as well as other special guests and musicians. The album itself is a simultaneous tribute to and parody of The Beatles. It contains cover versions of many obscure Beatles and solo members songs such as "The Lovely Linda" and "Cambridge 1969", as well as more conventional songs such as "Strawberry Fields Forever" and "Instant Karma!". The album, however, does not only contain covers of Beatles and related tunes. There are also covers of songs such as "Rock On" originally recorded by David Essex and "1, 2, 3, Red Light", originally recorded by The 1910 Fruitgum Company. In addition to the covers, there are also strange original compositions such as "Shompton In Babylon" and the Ono-esque "Two Virgins #9".

Cassette Track List 

 Instant Karma!
 Originally performed and written by John Lennon
 Rock On
 Originally performed and written by Dave Essex
 Rain
 Originally Performed by The Beatles. Written by Lennon / McCartney.
 Who Has Seen The Wind? / Bohemian Rhapsody
 Lyrics written by Yoko Ono. Music written by Queen
 Telephone Piece
 Originally performed by Yoko Ono
 Strawberry Fields Forever
 Originally Performed by The Beatles. Written by Lennon / McCartney.
 1, 2, 3, Red Light
 Originally performed by The 1910 Fruit Gum Company.
 The Luck Of The Irish
 Written and performed originally by John Lennon & Yoko Ono.
 Sisters, O Sisters
 Written and performed originally by John Lennon & Yoko Ono.
 The Lovely Linda
 Originally performed and written by Paul McCartney.
 Shompton In Babylon
 Original composition written by Dave Landry.
 Why?
 Originally written and performed by Yoko Ono.
 Two Virgins #9
 Original composition written by Dave Landry, Pat Smear and Melanie Vammen.
 Tomorrow Never Knows (Live)
 Originally Performed by The Beatles. Written by Lennon / McCartney.
 Cambridge 1969 (Live)
 Originally performed and written by John Lennon & Yoko Ono.

1989 albums
The Beatles tribute albums